Sandra Lizbeth Arévalo Hinostroza (born 14 April 1998) is a Peruvian footballer who plays as a midfielder for Alianza Lima and the Peru women's national team.

International career
Arévalo represented Peru at two South American U-17 Women's Championship editions (2012 and 2013) and the 2018 South American U-20 Women's Championship.

References

1998 births
Living people
Women's association football midfielders
Peruvian women's footballers
Footballers from Lima
Peru women's international footballers
Pan American Games competitors for Peru
Footballers at the 2019 Pan American Games
Sporting Cristal footballers
21st-century Peruvian women